Lophocoleus is a genus of moths of the family Erebidae. The genus was erected by Arthur Gardiner Butler in 1886. All of the species in this genus are found on Fiji.

Species
Lophocoleus acuta Robinson, 1975
Lophocoleus alpipuncta Robinson, 1975
Lophocoleus iridescens Robinson, 1975
Lophocoleus mirabilis Butler, 1886
Lophocoleus rubrescens Robinson, 1975
Lophocoleus suffusa Robinson, 1975

References

Herminiinae